Grevillea phillipsiana is a species of flowering plant in the family Proteaceae and is endemic to the south of Western Australia. It is a prickly, spreading to erect shrub with linear leaves, and clusters of red flowers.

Description
The edges of the leaves are rolled under enclosing most of the lower surface and the upper surface has ridges along its length.

TaxonomyGrevillea phillipsiana was first formally described in 1986 by Donald McGillivray in his book New Names in Grevillea (Proteaceae) from specimens collected by Marie Elizabeth Phillips near  Norseman in 1968. The specific epithet (phillipsiana'') honours the collector of the type specimens.

Distribution and habitat
This grevillea grows in shrubland, woodland and mallee scrub on rocky soil derived from granite, between Norseman and the Zanthus in the  Coolgardie and Nullarbor bioregions of southern Western Australia.

Conservation status
This grevillea is listed as "Priority One" by the Government of Western Australia Department of Biodiversity, Conservation and Attractions, meaning that it is known from only one or a few locations which are potentially at risk.

See also
 List of Grevillea species

References

phillipsiana
Proteales of Australia
Eudicots of Western Australia
Taxa named by Donald McGillivray
Plants described in 1986